Pontibacter aurantiacus  is a Gram-negative and rod-shaped bacterium from the genus of Pontibacter which has been isolated from soil which was contaminated with hexachlorocyclohexane from Ummari in India.

References

External links
Type strain of Pontibacter aurantiacus at BacDive -  the Bacterial Diversity Metadatabase

Cytophagia
Bacteria described in 2017